Nikolai Kamov is a Bulgarian politician. Kamov was a Member of Parliament as well as a delegate to the NATO Parliamentary Assembly.

References

Living people
Year of birth missing (living people)
Members of the National Assembly (Bulgaria)